The 2003 Valencian Community motorcycle Grand Prix was the last round of the 2003 MotoGP Championship. It took place on the weekend of 31 October - 2 November 2003 at the Circuit de Valencia.

MotoGP classification

250 cc classification

125 cc classification

Championship standings after the race (motoGP)

Below are the standings for the top five riders and constructors after round sixteen has concluded.

Riders' Championship standings

Constructors' Championship standings

 Note: Only the top five positions are included for both sets of standings.

References

Valencian Community motorcycle Grand Prix
Valencian
Valencian motorcycle Grand Prix
21st century in Valencia